Dorso is a Chilean metal band. Common themes in the band's music are horror film creatures, hyperbolic sexual fetishes and Chilean myths.

The band's frontman, Rodrigo Cuadra, became a TV presenter in the 1990s.

History

Early years (1984–1988) 
Dorso was formed in 1984 by Rodrigo Cuadra, who was 17 at the time. His vision for the band was for it to be a musical synthesis of extreme metal and progressive rock, drawing extensively from dark fantasy literature and gore films for inspiration.

Dorso made its first public gig in a Ñuñoa gym in 1984, with a setlist of heavy metal covers and original songs.

By the time of the release of their first demo, Parajes de lo Desconocido (1985), Dorso was a trio led by its original frontman and two new hires, Gamal Eltit in guitars and Jaime Palma in drums.

1989–1995 
Their first album, Bajo una luna cámbrica, was released in 1989. It featured an eclectic blend of prog rock-inspired thrash metal, retrospectively described as progressive metal, odd time signatures and traditional speed metal.

The second album, Romance (1990) is considered by many as one of the best of the band.

Eltit and the newly hired drummer Eduardo Topelberg left the band citing musical disagreements after recording Romance. Two new members joined the band, ex-Nimrod Marcelo Naves in drums and guitarist Alvaro Soms. This line-up went on to record Dorsos best-selling album to date, El Espanto Surge de la Tumba (1993). The album's heavy use of Spanglish, black humor and bilingual puns, as well as Soms' distinctive riff-writing became the defining characteristics of the band's sound.

Their next album, Big Monsters Aventura was released to some success in 1995, with the eponymous song being featured on MTV's Headbangers Ball. This album featured more goregrind elements than its predecessor.

Dorso now (since 1998) 
Following the release Disco Blood in 1998, the band went on to release two live albums followed by a short hiatus and the return of Eltit in guitars.

In 2008 the band released Espacium, and in 2012 Recolecciones Macabras del Campo Chileno, featuring for the first time some doom and black metal elements, with lyrical themes revolving around Chilean myths and legends.

Band members

Current lineup 
Rodrigo "Pera" Cuadra – vocals and bass, bass overdrive, synths, keyboards, percussion, acoustic guitar (since 1984)
Gamal Eltit – rhythm guitar, lead guitar, lute, percussion, programming, backing vocals (1984–1991, since 2001)
Álvaro Soms – lead guitar (since 1991)
Fran Muñoz – drums, percussion (since 2008)

Former members 
Mauricio Castillo – lead guitar (1984)
Alvaro Cuadra – rhythm guitar (1986)
Claudio Alfaro – bass (1984)
Juan Francisco Cueto – bass (1995)
Marcelo Castillo – drums, percussion (1984)
Gonzalo Lara – drums, percussion (1984)
Jaime Palma – drums, percussion (1984–1989)
Rafael Alfaro – drums, percussion (1989)
Juan Coderch – drums, percussion (1989)
Eduardo Topelberg – drums, percussion, backing vocals (1989–1991)
Marcelo Naves – drums, percussion (1991–2008)
Bernardo Riquelme – percussion (1984)

Discography 
 Bajo una luna Cámbrica (1989)
 Romance (1990)
 El Espanto Surge de la Tumba (1993)
 Big Monster Aventura (1995)
 Disco Blood (1998)
 Espacium (2008)
 Recolecciones Macabras del Campo Chileno (2012)
 Gore and Roll (2019)

Demos 
 Parajes de lo Desconocido (1985)	
 Guerra de Criaturas (1987)

Live albums 
 Lari la live! (2002)
 Unplugged Cósmico (2005)

Other albums 
 Gallinazeous Death SQVAD (pronounced "Squad") (1989)
 Sangre Eterna (2002)
 El Huésped (2005)

Note: Both items are included as bonus tracks on Espacium (2008).

References 

Speed metal musical groups
Chilean thrash metal musical groups
Chilean death metal musical groups
Groove metal musical groups
Progressive metal musical groups
Avant-garde metal musical groups
Musical groups established in 1984